are rice dumplings (dango) skewered onto sticks in groups of 3–5 (traditionally 5) and covered with a sweet soy sauce glaze. It is characterized by its glassy glaze and burnt fragrance.

Mitarashi dango allegedly originates from the Kamo Mitarashi Tea House in the Shimogamo area of Sakyo ward of Kyoto, Japan. Another theory is that the 5-dango version sold at the original tea house was made to imitate a human body; the top-most dango represented the head, and the remaining four represented the arms and legs.

External links 
 Mitarashi dango recipe

Japanese cuisine
Dumplings